James King, Jim King or Jimmy King may refer to:

Military 
James King, 1st Lord Eythin (1589–1652), Scottish general in Swedish service and later in the English Civil War
James King (Royal Navy officer) (1750–1784), British Royal Navy captain who served under James Cook
James Wilson King (1818–1905), Chief Engineer of the United States Navy
James W. King (1842–1903), American Civil War soldier and newspaper editor
James C. King, former United States Army lieutenant general and former director of the National Geospatial-Intelligence Agency, 1998–2001

Politics 
James G. King (1791–1853), American businessman and United States Representative from New Jersey
James King King (1806–1881), British MP for Herefordshire
James A. King (1832–1899), Scottish cabinet minister of the Republic of Hawaii
James King (Quebec politician) (1848–1900), Canadian businessman and member of the Legislative Assembly of Quebec
James Harold King (1871–1949), physician and politician in Ontario, Canada
James Horace King (1873–1955), Canadian Minister of Pensions and National Health, 1928–1930
James Chisholm King (1886–1970), politician in Saskatchewan, Canada
Jim King (politician) (1939–2009), American politician, Florida state senator
James King (Maryland politician) (born 1974), member of the Maryland House of Delegates

Sports

Cricket
James King (Australian cricketer) (1851–1921), Australian cricketer
James King (cricketer, born 1855) (1855–?), English cricketer
James King (cricketer, born 1869) (1869–1948), English cricketer
James King (cricketer, born 1942), English cricketer

Association football
James King (Scottish footballer) (1906–1985), Scottish international footballer
James King (English footballer) (born 1996), English footballer

Basketball
Jim King (basketball, born 1941) (born 1941), American basketball player, former basketball coach for the University of Tulsa
Jim King (basketball, born 1943), American basketball player in the 1968 Olympics
Jimmy King (born 1973), American basketball player, member of the University of Michigan Fab Five

Rugby
James King (rugby league), rugby league footballer for Ireland, Barrow Raiders, and Leigh Centurions
James King (rugby union, born 1986), Scottish rugby union player
James King (rugby union, born 1987),  New Zealand rugby union player
James King (rugby union, born 1990), Welsh rugby union player

Other sports
Jim King (footballer) (1873–1929), Australian rules footballer
Jim King (baseball) (1932–2015), American baseball player
Jim King (American football), American football coach
James King (hurdler) (born 1949), American hurdler

Entertainment 
Jack King (animator) (1895–1958), American animator, especially with Walt Disney, whose real name was James King
James King (tenor) (1925–2005), American opera singer
Jim King (saxophonist) (1942–2012), English rock musician, member of the band Family
James King (bluegrass) (1958–2016), American bluegrass music singer
James King (film critic), British broadcast film critic
James King (musician), American soul musician, member of the band Fitz and The Tantrums
Jaime King (born 1979), American actress and model, sometimes billed as James King

Others 
James King, 4th Baron Kingston (1693–1761), British peer
James King (priest) (1715–1795), Canon of Windsor and Dean of Raphoe
James King, 5th Earl of Kingston (1800–1869), Irish peer and barrister
James King (pioneer) (1800–1857), Scottish-born Australian businessman and winemaker
James King of William (1822–1856), American newspaper editor
Sir James King, 1st Baronet (1830–1911), Scottish businessman, and Lord Provost of Glasgow, 1886–89
James King (architect) (fl. 1860s–1892), American architect
James M. King (1839–1907), American Methodist minister, writer, and political activist
James Albert King (1864–1933), paternal grandfather of civil rights leader Dr. Martin Luther King, Jr.
James L. King (engineer) (1922–c. 1995), British engineer
James Lawrence King (born 1927), United States federal judge 
James Roger King (1927–1991), American ornithologist

Fictional
Jimmy King (Emmerdale), a fictional character in the British TV soap Emmerdale
James King, a fictional character in the U.S. TV series Last Resort

See also
King James (disambiguation)
Jamie King (disambiguation)
Jimmy King (disambiguation)